LIBD may refer to:

 Lieber Institute for Brain Development, a nonprofit research center located in Baltimore, Maryland
 LIBD, the ICAO code for Bari Karol Wojtyła Airport, Bari, Italy